Palatschinke (or palaccinka, plural palatschinken) is a thin crêpe-like variety of pancake of Greco-Roman origin. While the dessert is most common in South and West Slavic countries, it is also generally known in other parts of Central and Eastern Europe. Names of the dish include pallaçinka (Albanian), Palatschinke (pl. Palatschinken) (Austrian German), palačinka (pl. palačinke) (Bosnian, Croatian, Montenegrin, Slovene), palacinka (Slovak), palačinka (Czech), палачинка (Bulgarian, Macedonian, Serbian), налисник (Ukrainian),  naleśnik (Polish), clătite (Romanian), palacinta or palacinca (Italian) and palacsinta (Hungarian).

History and etymology

The dish is of Greco-Roman origin. In 350 BCE, the ancient Greek poets Archestratos and Antiphanes first mentioned plakous. Cato the Elder's short work De agri cultura ("On Farming") from about 160 BC includes an elaborate recipe for placenta. Palatschinke still bears the same name of its Greek and Roman ancestors. 

The origin of the name comes from the Latin word placenta, which in turn is derived from the Greek word plakous for thin or layered flat breads. The name of the dish has followed a track of borrowing across several languages of Central and Southeastern Europe; the dish originates from the Roman era of Central Europe and the Austrian-German term palatschinke(n) is deemed to have been borrowed from Czech palačinka, that in turn from Hungarian palacsinta, and that in turn from Romanian plăcintă (a cake, a pie), where it ultimately derives from Latin placenta.

According to the Hungarian Ethnographic Encyclopedia, the Hungarian word palacsinta is an Italian loanword.

Palačinka is also the name in most West and South Slavic languages (Slovak palacinka, Bosnian, Bulgarian, Czech, Croatian, Montenegrin, Macedonian, Serbian, Slovenian palačinka, палачинка). In Polish, the equivalent is called a naleśnik, in Ukrainian налисник (nalysnyk) or млинець (mlynec), in Russian налистник (nalistnik) or блинчик (blinchik), in Romanian clătită.

Versions

Central European palatschinken (palačeke) are thin pancakes similar to the French crêpe. The main difference between the French and Central European version of the dish is that the mixture for palatschinken can be used straight away unlike that of crepes which is suggested to be left at rest for several hours. Palatschinken are made by creating a batter from eggs, wheat flour, milk, and salt and frying it in a pan with butter or oil. Unlike thicker types of pancakes, palatschinken are usually served with different types of fillings and eaten for lunch or dinner.

Palatschinken are traditionally rolled with apricot, strawberry, or plum jam, and sprinkled with confectioner's sugar. A variety of fruit sauces (like apple sauce), or thick fruit butters called lekvar (plum, prune, raspberry, cherry or sour cherry jam), lemon juice and sugar, chocolate sauce, hazelnut-chocolate cream (Nutella), almonds, dried or fresh fruits, sweet cottage or quark cheese and raisins, cocoa powder, poppy seed, are common modern ingredients. Rakott palacsinta are layered pancakes with sweet cottage cheese and raisins, jam and walnut layers between the pancakes, baked in the oven, comparable to the French mille crêpes.

A well-known Hungarian version of palatschinke is the Gundel pancake (Gundel palacsinta), made with ground walnuts, raisin, candied orange peel, cinnamon, and rum filling, served flambéed in dark chocolate sauce made with egg yolks, heavy cream, and cocoa.

Palatschinken may also be eaten unsweetened as a main course, such as a meat-filled Hortobágyi palacsinta. They may also be eaten plain, filled with cheeses, or vegetables such as mushroom, spinach or sauerkraut, topped with sour cream, or cut into thin strips, called Flädle in Germany′s and Switzerland's Alemannic dialects and Frittaten in Austria. Flädle/Frittaten are used in Frittaten soup – pancake strips served in clear broth.

See also

Blintz
Kaiserschmarrn
List of pancakes

References

Citations

Sources

External links
Kuvar online Gözleme ili turske palačinke

Austrian cuisine
Bosnia and Herzegovina cuisine
Bulgarian cuisine
Czech cuisine
Hungarian cuisine
Pancakes
Romanian cuisine
Serbian cuisine
Slovak cuisine
Articles containing video clips

de:Eierkuchen#Mittel- und Osteuropa